Chang Lin (born on 28 November 1988 in Harbin, Heilongjiang) is a Chinese professional basketball player for the Shanxi Loongs of the Chinese Basketball Association (CBA). He played American college basketball for the Long Beach State 49ers.

References 

1988 births
Living people